Qiu Fengjia, Chiu Feng-Chia or Yau Fung-Kap (26 December 1864 – 25 February 1912) was a Taiwanese Hakka−Chinese patriot, educator, and poet.

History
He was born in Aulang Town, Tamsui Ting, Taiwan Prefecture, Fujian Province (modern-day Tongluo, Miaoli County, Taiwan) with ancestry from Jiaoling, Guangdong, in 1864, during Qing rule.  He had a son Chiu (Qiu) Nian-Tai (literally remember Taiwan 丘 念 台) and two grand children Chiu Ying-Nan (丘 應 楠 son) and Chiu Ying-Tang (丘 應 棠 daughter).

Qiu advocated and organized the setting up of militia forces in Taiwan and sold his property assets for the cause. By 1894, there were 140 camps of militia forces totally 100 000 men in Taiwan. Following the Qing dynasty's cession of Formosa (Taiwan) and the Pescadores to Japan in April 1895 at the end of the First Sino-Japanese War, the Republic of Formosa was formed. Tang Jingsong, the Qing governor of Taiwan, was appointed as President, with Qiu as Vice-President and Liu Yongfu, commander of the armed forces. Qiu was also the commander of the militia forces.

Tang was suspicious of Liu Yongfu who had won fame as a Chinese patriot fighting against the French in northern Vietnam (Tonkin) in the 1870s and early 1880s. Liu was sent to defend Tainan in southern Taiwan. The Japanese attacked Keelung in northern Taiwan and easily defeated Tang's ill-discipline forces. Tang quickly fled Taiwan after the defeat. Qiu led the militia forces to continue the fighting but was advised by his father to leave Taiwan so that he could make a comeback another time. The militia forces, including women in its ranks, continued the resistance for few months, and inflicted fewer deaths on the invading Japanese army. This figure was many times higher than the losses in the First Sino-Japanese War against the Japanese forces.

Qiu was later involved in Xinhai revolution and was Guangdong Representative for the Republic of China Provisional Presidential Election in 1911. He later became a member of the government of Sun Yat-sen. 
 
Feng Chia University in Taichung, Taiwan is named in honor of him.

References

External links
 ChinaTaiwan.org 
 China History Forum 
Taipei Times https://www.taipeitimes.com/News/feat/archives/2018/12/23/2003706629

1864 births
1912 deaths
Politicians of the Republic of China
Taiwanese poets
Taiwanese politicians
19th-century Taiwanese writers
20th-century Taiwanese writers
People of the 1911 Revolution
Hakka people
Taiwanese people of Hakka descent
People from Jiaoling
People from Miaoli County
Taiwan under Qing rule
Taiwan under Japanese rule